Mercury Pookkal is a  2006 Tamil language romantic drama film, directed by S. S. Stanley starring Srikanth, Meera Jasmine. The music is composed by Karthik Raja. This film's name is based on the famous Tamil novel of Balakumaran.

Plot
Karthik, is from a middle-class family and is doing his MCA final year. He is an outstanding student with high ambitions. He works part-time in a courier company and takes care of his expenses. He also yearns for beautiful classy girls.  Anbu Selvi is from a rural landlord's family and is doing her B.Com in Trichy. Her pranks and her outgoing personality makes her father Rathnam fear that she might bring disrepute to the family name and so he decides to give her in marriage to his friend's son, Karthik.

Both the youngsters try to resist marriage but are compelled to agree in the end. The unwilling couple make an agreement on the first night that they will play according to the elders' tune for a while and once they are capable of taking care of themselves, they can part their own ways. Anbu is also admitted to the same college as Karthik and the turn of events makes Anbu realize the importance of a good married life and how she has to make her husband like her. In spite of her attempts, Karthik remains elusive and after some frames he also realizes the meaning of a good wedded life. When he is about to expose his love, turn of events separate the couple. But the couple stay determined to unite despite the stubborn stance of both their fathers. After much drama they unite happily.

Cast
 Srikanth as Karthik
 Meera Jasmine as  Anbu Selvi
 Sameksha
 Karunas
 Delhi Ganesh 
Kurinji Nathan
 Mahadevan as Rathnam
 Irfan in a cameo appearance

Soundtrack
Film score (BGM) was composed by Balabarathi and soundtrack was by Karthik Raja, while lyrics written by Pa. Vijay.
 "Jaladheepam" - Shruti Pathak, Karthik
 "Malarvaai" — Sukhwinder Singh, Bobbie
 "Mugurtha Neram" — Feji Mani, Ganga, Kunal Ganjawala, Hamsika Iyer
 "Pachakiliye" — Shankar Mahadevan, Priya
 "Solla Vaarthaigal II" - Shreya Ghoshal, Karthik Raja
 "Solla Vaarthaigal I" — Ganga, Udit Narayan, Hariharan

Release and reception
Mercury Pookkal was advertised as a film "like Missiamma". Indiaglitz wrote "Stanley needs a pat in the back for thinking out of the box. Unfortunately towards the second-half needless stunt sequences and couple of songs certainly stems the flow of the brisk screenplay." Rediff wrote "The simple plot had all the potential to be a great film. But Stanly [..] stumbles in the narration and comes up with a pathetic ending." The Hindu wrote "Stanley's treatment in `Mercury ... ' shows more maturity and class than his earlier films."

References

2006 films
Indian romantic drama films
2006 romantic drama films
2000s Tamil-language films
Films directed by S. S. Stanley
Films scored by Karthik Raja